Lalaklu (also Romanized as Lalaklū; also known as Lalaglū and Lialiali) is a village in, and the capital of, Marhemetabad-e Jonubi Rural District of the Central District of Miandoab County, West Azerbaijan province, Iran. At the 2006 National Census, its population was 1,397 in 318 households. The following census in 2011 counted 1,731 people in 418 households. The latest census in 2016 showed a population of 1,640 people in 464 households.

References 

Miandoab County

Populated places in West Azerbaijan Province

Populated places in Miandoab County